Robert Van De Weyer (born 9 November 1945) is a Belgian judoka. He competed in the men's half-middleweight event at the 1972 Summer Olympics.

References

1945 births
Living people
Belgian male judoka
Olympic judoka of Belgium
Judoka at the 1972 Summer Olympics
People from Wilrijk